Vishniac Peak is a peak (2,280 m) which rises just north of the head of Webb Glacier and 3 nautical miles (6 km) southwest of Skew Peak in southern Victoria Land. Mapped by United States Geological Survey (USGS) from surveys and U.S. Navy aerial photography, 1947–62. Named by Advisory Committee on Antarctic Names (US-ACAN) for Wolf V. Vishniac (1922–73), professor of biology at the University of Rochester, New York, who made Antarctic studies (1971–72 and 1973) on the water absorption of soil particles and its microbiological significance, and the ability of microorganisms to withstand a hostile milieu. Dr. Vishniac fell to his death in the Asgard Range, upper Wright Valley, 20 nautical miles (37 km) south of this peak, on December 11, 1973.

See also
Webb Icefall

Mountains of the Asgard Range
McMurdo Dry Valleys